Jawanshir Qizilbash is an Azerbaijani tribe and a part of the Afshar, adherents of Twelver Shi'ism. They belong to the Qizilbash people of Afghanistan. In Afghanistan, the clan is known to have originally migrated into the country during the reign of Nader Shah (r. 1736–1747). This tribe is living in Kabul city especially in Chindawol, Moradkhani, and Wazirabad.

See also 
 Afshar language
 Afshar tribe
 Afsharid dynasty
 Caucasian Albania
 Javanshir clan
 History of Azerbaijan
 Qizilbash

Sources 
 Christine Noelle. State and tribe in nineteenth-century Afghanistan: the reign of Amir Dost Muhammad Khan (1826-1863). Psychology Press, 1997. , 

Ethnic groups in Afghanistan
Turkic peoples of Asia